Humberto Martins Duarte (born 14 April 1961) is a Brazilian actor.

Filmography

Television

References

External links 

Brazilian male telenovela actors
1961 births
People from Nova Iguaçu
Living people